This is the discography of American R&B group Brownstone.

Studio albums

Compilation albums
 All for Love (2000, Sony Music)
 Super Hits (2009, Sony Music)

Singles

Featured singles

References

External links
 

Discographies of American artists
Soul music discographies